Brachida hatayana is a species of rove beetles first found in Turkey.

References

Further reading
ASSING, V. "On the Staphylinidae of Socotra Island, Yemen (Insecta: Coleoptera)." Linzer Biologische Beiträge 44.2 (2012): 973–986.

Aleocharinae
Beetles described in 2010